Pełty  is a village in the administrative district of Gmina Myszyniec, within Ostrołęka County, Masovian Voivodeship, in east-central Poland.

See also
Barney Pelty (1880-1939), American Major League Baseball player

References

Villages in Ostrołęka County